Mille-Îles is a provincial electoral district in Quebec, Canada that elects members to the National Assembly of Quebec. The district is located in Laval and includes the eastern portion of the island of Laval (Île Jésus).

It was created for the 1973 election from a part of Fabre.

In the change from the 2001 to the 2011 electoral map, it lost some territory to Vimont electoral district.

Members of the National Assembly

Election results

Source: Official Results, Le Directeur général des élections du Québec.

Source: Official Results, Le Directeur général des élections du Québec.

Source: Official Results, Le Directeur général des élections du Québec.

Source: Official Results, Le Directeur général des élections du Québec.

References

External links
Information
 Elections Quebec

Election results
 Election results (National Assembly)

Maps
 2011 map (PDF)
 2001 map (Flash)
2001–2011 changes (Flash)
1992–2001 changes (Flash)
 Electoral map of Laval region
 Quebec electoral map, 2011

Politics of Laval, Quebec
Quebec provincial electoral districts
21st-century Canadian politicians